Olivella floralia, common name the common rice (dwarf) olive, is a species of small sea snail, marine gastropod mollusk in the subfamily Olivellinae, within the family Olividae, the olives.  Species in the genus Olivella are commonly called dwarf olives.

Description
The length of the shell of this species varies between 6 mm and 15 mm. The shell is slender and mostly white, with upper whorls which are white to blue or purple.

Distribution
Olivella floralia is found in the Caribbean. It is also found off of North Carolina, USA, to Colombia and East Brazil.

References

 Duclos P.L. (1844–1848). Oliva. In J.C. Chenu, Illustrations conchyliologiques ou description et figures de toutes les coquilles connues vivantes et fossiles, classées suivant le système de Lamarck modifié d'après les progrès de la science et comprenant les genres nouveaux et les espèces récemment découvertes: 5-28 
 Jensen, R. H. (1997). A Checklist and Bibliography of the Marine Molluscs of Bermuda. Unp. , 547 pp
 Rosenberg, G.; Moretzsohn, F.; García, E. F. (2009). Gastropoda (Mollusca) of the Gulf of Mexico, Pp. 579–699 in: Felder, D.L. and D.K. Camp (eds.), Gulf of Mexico–Origins, Waters, and Biota. Texas A&M Press, College Station, Texa
 Paulmier G. (2015). Les Olivellidae (Neogastropoda) des Antilles françaises. Description de quatre nouvelles espèces. Xenophora Taxonomy. 8: 3-23

External links
 Duclos, P. L. (1835–1840). Histoire naturelle générale et particulière de tous les genres de coquilles univalves marines a l'état vivant et fossile publiée par monographie. Genre Olive. Paris: Institut de France. 33 plates: pls 1-12

floralia
Gastropods described in 1844